The 1931 Quebec general election was held on August 24, 1931, to elect members of the Legislative Assembly of the Province of Quebec, Canada.  The incumbent Quebec Liberal Party, led by Louis-Alexandre Taschereau, was re-elected, defeating the Quebec Conservative Party, led by Camillien Houde.

It was the third general election victory in a row for Taschereau, who had held office since 1920.

Redistribution of ridings
An Act passed in 1930 increased the number of MLAs from 85 to 90 through the following changes:

Results
This was the last election in which a candidate campaigned in multiple ridings. Camillien Houde was nominated in both Montréal–Saint-Jacques and Montréal–Sainte-Marie, and he lost both contests.

|-
! colspan=2 rowspan=2 | Political party
! rowspan=2 | Party leader
! colspan=4 | MPPs
! colspan=4 | Votes
|-
! Candidates
!1927
!1931
!±
!#
! ±
!%
! ± (pp)
|-
|rowspan="4" |  
|style="text-align:left;" colspan="10"|Government candidates
|-
|style="text-align:left;" |
|style="text-align:left;"|Louis-Alexandre Taschereau
|90
|74
|79
|5
|268,732
|80,045
|54.88
|4.46
|-
|style="text-align:left;" |
|style="text-align:left;"|–
|2
|–
|–
|–
|2,787
|1,422
|0.57
|0.14
|-
|style="text-align:left;" |
|style="text-align:left;"|–
|3
|–
|–
|–
|711
|
|0.15
|
|-
|rowspan="4" |  
|style="text-align:left;" colspan="10"|Opposition candidates
|-
|style="text-align:left;" |
|style="text-align:left;"|Camillien Houde
|90
|9
|11
|2
|213,223
|104,118
|43.54
|9.23
|-
|style="text-align:left;" |
|style="text-align:left;"|–
|2
|1
|–
|1
|1,683
|2,749
|0.34
|1.05
|-
|style="text-align:left;" |
|style="text-align:left;"|–
|1
|–
|–
|–
|106
|2,579
|0.02
|0.82
|-
|rowspan="5" |  
|style="text-align:left;" colspan="10"|Other candidates
|-
|style="text-align:left;" |
|style="text-align:left;"|–
|2
|1
|–
|1
|1,065
|8,280
|0.22
|2.72
|-
|style="text-align:left;" |
|style="text-align:left;"|–
|4
|–
|–
|–
|584
|
|0.12
|
|-
|style="text-align:left;" |
|style="text-align:left;"|–
|2
|–
|–
|–
|481
|1,861
|0.10
|0.64
|-
|style="text-align:left;" |
|style="text-align:left;"|–
|2
|–
|–
|–
|323
|
|0.06
|
|-
! colspan="3" style="text-align:left;" | Total
| 167
| 85
! " colspan="2"| 90
! " colspan="2"| 489,695
! " colspan="2"| 100%
|-
| colspan="7" style="text-align:left;" | Rejected ballots
| 4,190
| 1,347
| colspan="2"|
|-
| colspan="7" style="text-align:left;" | Voter turnout
| 493,885
| 173,081
| 77.01
| 14.10
|-
| colspan="7" style="text-align:left;" | Registered electors (contested ridings only)
| 641,324
| 131,389
| colspan="2"|
|-
| colspan="5" style="text-align:left;" | Candidates returned by acclamation
| –
| 12
| colspan="4"|
|}

See also
 List of Quebec premiers
 Politics of Quebec
 Timeline of Quebec history
 List of Quebec political parties
 18th Legislative Assembly of Quebec

Further reading

References

Quebec general election
Elections in Quebec
General election
Quebec general election